Chengqu Subdistrict is a subdistrict and the seat of Yuanshi County, Hebei province, China. , it has 4 residential communities under its administration.

See also
List of township-level divisions of Hebei

References

Township-level divisions of Hebei